Goniocera versicolor is a Palearctic species of fly in the family Tachinidae.

Distribution
Austria, Germany, United Kingdom, France, Sweden.

Hosts
Malacosoma neustrium, Malacosoma castrense, Aporia crataegi.

References

Tachininae
Diptera of Europe
Insects described in 1820
Taxa named by Carl Fredrik Fallén